Devil's bird may refer to several kinds of birds:
 The storm petrel (Hydrobatidae), especially the European storm petrel (Hydrobates pelagicus)
 The yellowhammer (Emberiza citrinella)
 The pied wagtail (Motacilla alba yarrellii)